Workforce casualisation is the process in which employment shifts from a preponderance of full-time and permanent positions to casual and contract positions.

In Australia, 35% of all workers are casual or contract employees who are not paid for sick leave or annual leave. While there has been considerable talk of the increasing casualisation of the workforce, data shows that figures have actually remained relatively stable since the turn of the century with the greatest changes occurring in the period between 1992 to 1997 (casual only, not contracted employees).  The greater concern is the increase in "insecure employment" which is difficult to quantify due to no clear definition of what this actually means. 

In the United Kingdom, 53% of academics teaching or doing research in British universities manage on some form of insecure, non-permanent contract, ranging from short-term contracts that typically elapse within nine months, to those paid by the hour to give classes or mark essays and exams.

See also 

 Casual work
 Change management 
 Contingent workforce
 Contingent work
 Gig economy
 Permatemp
 Precariat
 Precarious work
 Temporary work
 Zero-hour contract

References 

Employment classifications
Labor relations
Precarious work